The 1948 NCAA Golf Championship was the tenth annual NCAA-sanctioned golf tournament to determine the individual and team national champions of men's collegiate golf in the United States.

The tournament was held at the Stanford Golf Course in Stanford, California.

San Jose State won the team title, nine strokes ahead of defending champions LSU on the leaderboard. Coached by Wilbur V. Hubbard, this was the Spartans' first NCAA team national title. 

The individual championship was won by Bob Harris, also from San Jose State.

Team results

Note: Top 10 only
DC = Defending champions

References

NCAA Men's Golf Championship
Golf in California
NCAA Golf Championship
NCAA Golf Championship
NCAA Golf Championship